Peter Parker is a fictional character portrayed by Tom Holland in the Marvel Cinematic Universe (MCU) media franchise–based on the Marvel Comics character of the same name—also known by his alias, Spider-Man.  Parker is initially depicted as a student at the Midtown School of Science and Technology who later received spider-like and superhuman abilities after being bitten by a radioactive spider, becoming Spider-Man. Parker is eventually recruited by Tony Stark, who mentors him and recruits him into the Avengers during the battle against Thanos. Following the Blip, Parker briefly encounters and fights the manipulative Mysterio while on a school trip across Europe; Mysterio frames Parker for his murder and reveals his identity to the world, prompting Parker to seek Stephen Strange's help months later to reverse this. Strange's spell causes the multiverse to fracture, but it is eventually resolved by casting a new spell that permanently erases the world's shared knowledge of his civilian persona, including his relationships with his loved ones, friends, and other superhero allies.

Holland's version of the character is the successor to both the Peter Parker played by Tobey Maguire in Sam Raimi's Spider-Man trilogy (2002–2007) and the Peter Parker played by Andrew Garfield in Marc Webb's The Amazing Spider-Man duology (2012–2014), both of whom reprise their roles and appear in Spider-Man: No Way Home (2021) as supporting characters to Holland's Parker. To distinguish himself from the other versions, he is referred to by the other Parkers as "Peter-One".

Parker is a central character in the MCU's "Infinity Saga", appearing in six MCU films . A fourth Spider-Man film is in development, with Holland expected to reprise his role which is expected to start a new trilogy of films. Alternate versions of Parker appear in the Disney+ animated series What If...? (2021—present) and Spider-Man: Freshman Year (2024), the former in which he is voiced by Hudson Thames. Holland has received praise and several accolades for his portrayal of Spider-Man.

Fictional character biography

Early life 
Peter Parker was born on August 10, 2001, in Forest Hills, Queens, and is primarily raised by his Aunt May. While attending high school at the Midtown School of Science and Technology in 2015, Parker is bitten by a radioactive spider, giving him superhuman abilities. He becomes the superhero Spider-Man by using his powers for good, and maintains a secret identity so his enemies can not attack his friends and family. At Midtown School, Parker is smart but is frequently bullied by Flash Thompson. He also befriends Ned Leeds, who as been his best friend since they were young and his girlfriend Michelle Jones, known as MJ. he constructs a homemade Spider-Man suit, designing it as a red and blue hoodie also equipped with his web-shooters.

Avengers Civil War and facing the Vulture 

In 2016, Parker is living with May in Queens, New York when he meets Tony Stark at his apartment, who reveals that he knows Parker is Spider-Man; Stark recruits him to join his conflict with Steve Rogers and sends Parker to Germany, where the latter is given a new Spider-Man suit designed by him and is brought to the Leipzig/Halle airport to aid Stark and his Avengers faction against Rogers' team. Parker is a fan of Rogers despite them being on opposing sides, Rogers respecting Parker's bravery; They briefly exchange where in New York they are from upon fighting. After incapacitating Bucky Barnes and Sam Wilson, and battling a giant Scott Lang, Parker is sent back to Queens.

Two months later, Parker continues to balance his life as a high school student and Spider-Man, but eagerly awaits his next mission from Stark and continuously texts Stark's driver and bodyguard Happy Hogan. Returning home from operating as Spider-Man, Ned accidentally learns Parker's secret identity. Parker leaves a school party hosted by his crush, senior student Liz, to stop a drug deal by Jackson Brice and Herman Schultz, who planned to sell Chitauri weapons to Aaron Davis. Parker follows Brice and Schultz before being caught by their boss Adrian Toomes, who drops Parker to a nearby lake. Stark remotely saves Parker using one of his Iron Man armors, and warns Parker of further involvement with Toomes. On an academic decathlon trip to Washington, D.C., Parker and Ned disable the tracker on Parker's suit, and Parker later captures Toomes' new buyer Mac Gargan aboard the Staten Island Ferry after returning to New York. Toomes escapes and a malfunctioning weapon tears the ferry in half, which Parker attempts to briefly fix it before Stark arrives and saves the passengers. Stark confiscates Parker's suit as punishment for his recklessness, and Liz accepts to be Parker's homecoming date.

Later, while on the way to pick Liz for the homecoming dance, Parker discovers Toomes is Liz's father and Toomes also deduces Parker is Spider-Man. Despite Toomes warning him not to interfere with his business, Parker abandons Liz to stop Toomes from stealing a Damage Control (DODC) cargo plane that is shipping equipment from Avengers Tower using his homemade suit. When Toomes' Vulture suit is damaged, Parker saves his life, but leaves him in a web for the DODC and Hogan to arrest. The next day at school, Liz is angry at Parker for abandoning her before tearfully informing him that she and her mother will be moving away since Toomes is imprisoned. Hogan brings Parker to Avengers Compound, where Stark congratulates him on defeating Toomes and offers him a place in the Avengers, showcasing the newly-developed Iron Spider armor with it. Parker rejects and prefers to stay as the friendly neighborhood Spider-Man in Queens, and while wearing his Spider-Man suit, he is caught by May.

Infinity War and resurrection 

In 2018, while headed on field trip, Parker sees the Q-Ship above New York City and asks Ned to cover for him as he leaves the school bus. As Spider-Man, he helps Stark fight Cull Obsidian and follows Ebony Maw—who had captured Stephen Strange–to his spaceship. This prompts Stark to fly into space and rescue Parker, sending the Iron Spider armor to Parker. He and Stark rescue Strange and kill Maw, and Stark officially declares Parker an Avenger. The spaceship lands on the planet Titan, where Parker, Stark, and Strange are confronted by some members of the Guardians of the Galaxy, before they realize that they are both on the same side: stopping Thanos. Thanos eventually arrives and Parker helps subdue him along with Strange, Stark, Peter Quill, Drax, and Mantis. However, Quill attacks Thanos, making Parker lose his grip on removing the Infinity Gauntlet. Parker rescues an unconscious Mantis, Quill, Drax, and Nebula after Thanos throws Titan's moon at them. Thanos leaves and is successful in disintegrating half of all life, including Parker, in the Blip.

In 2023, Parker is restored to life by Bruce Banner and is brought via a portal to the destroyed Avengers Compound to assist the Avengers in defeating an alternate 2014 Thanos. Parker reunites with Stark, who later sacrifices his life to save the universe; Parker attends his funeral and returns to high school, reuniting with Ned.

School vacation and encountering Mysterio

Eight months later in mid-2024, Parker still reeling from Stark's death decides to take a break from vigilantism and goes on a school trip to Europe with Ned and other classmates, where he plans to reveal his romantic feelings towards his classmate MJ. In Venice, Parker and his classmates are attacked by a water monster but are saved by Quentin Beck. Parker is approached by Nick Fury, whose calls he had been fielding and who appoints Beck as his teammate in battling further element-based monsters (the "Elementals") throughout Europe. Fury gives Parker "E.D.I.T.H.", an artificial intelligence created by Stark to give to Parker. After defeating the Fire Elemental in Prague, Parker feels he "isn't ready to be the next Iron Man" and gives E.D.I.T.H. to Beck, who unbeknownst to Parker is a former disgruntled employee of Stark's.

Parker goes on a walk with MJ, and reveals his attraction to her and accidentally his identity as Spider-Man. The pair discover Beck used holographic projectors to visually create the Elementals, and Parker goes to Berlin to warn Fury about Beck's deception. Beck catches wind of this and traps Parker in multiple illusions, and while impersonating Fury, tricks the latter into telling the names of the students that know his fraudulence. Parker is hit by a train and left for dead in the Netherlands, but calls Hogan and creates a new suit for himself using Stark's technology as he enters London to stop Beck, who has created an amalgamated Elemental using Stark Industries drones. Ned and MJ evacuate the students and fight with Hogan while Parker destroys those drones and approaches Beck. Beck attempts to kill Parker using the drones, but Parker manages to get a drone to shoot him, Beck beginning to bleed. Parker gets E.D.I.T.H. back, as Beck seemingly dies, and disables the drones; Parker and his classmates return to New York City, with he and MJ planning a date the following week.

Exposed secret identity, multiversal crisis and losing May 

After swinging through the city, Parker and MJ witness a broadcast from J. Jonah Jameson of TheDailyBugle.net showing an edited video of Beck incriminating Parker for the London attack and revealing his identity as Spider-Man, much to the latter's shock. Parker, MJ, Ned, and May are interrogated by Damage Control, and the murder charges are dropped with lawyer Matt Murdock's help, but Parker's friends still grapple with negative publicity from Jameson and Beck supporters. Parker and May then move into Happy Hogan's apartment for their safety. After his, Ned, and MJ's applications to MIT are rejected in light of the controversy, Parker goes to the New York Sanctum to ask Stephen Strange for help; Strange, despite Wong's warnings, attempts to cast a spell that would make everyone forget Parker is Spider-Man, though Parker repeatedly tampers with it. He tries to convince an MIT administrator to reconsider his and his friends' applications before being attacked by Otto Octavius, who rips Parker's nanotechnology from his Iron Spider suit, which bonds with his mechanical tentacles and allows Parker to disable them. As the Green Goblin arrives and attacks, Strange teleports Parker and Octavius to the Sanctum, where he explains that before he could contain the tampered spell, it summoned people from alternate universes who know Spider-Man's identity and which allowed the multiverse to be broken open. Strange orders Parker, MJ, and Ned to find and capture multiversal visitors; they locate and retrieve Max Dillon and Flint Marko, and later, Parker retrieves Norman Osborn from a F.E.A.S.T. building and discovers that the latter, Dillon, and Octavius were pulled from their universes just before their deaths. He refuses to send the villains home to their deadly fates in their original realities and traps Strange in the Mirror Dimension, stealing the spell, takes the villains to Hogan's apartment, and cures Octavius.

The Goblin persona takes control of Osborn, convinces the uncured villains to betray Parker, and a fight ensues which culminates with Goblin fatally injuring May before escaping. Before she dies, May tells Parker that "with great power, there must also come great responsibility". After May's death, A bereaved Parker, whose guilt was accentuated by Jameson's gaslighting reporting, is ready to give up and send the villains to die; he is comforted by his friends and meets two alternate versions of himself that are later nicknamed "Peter-Two" and "Peter-Three". The alternate Parkers share stories of losing loved ones and encourage Parker (later nicknamed "Peter-One") to fight in May's honor. They develop cures for the villains and lure the Lizard, Dillon, and Marko to the Statue of Liberty, managing to cure them. The Goblin appears and unleashes the contained spell, and an enraged Peter-One tries to kill him before being stopped by Peter-Two. The former and Peter-Three inject the Goblin cure into him, restoring Osborn's sanity.

Peter-One realizes that the only way to protect the multiverse is to erase Peter Parker from everyone's memory and requests that Strange do so, while promising MJ and Ned that he will find them again. The spell is cast and everyone returns to their respective universes, with him saying goodbye to his alternate versions. A few weeks later, Parker visits MJ and Ned to reintroduce himself, but decides against it, not wanting to endanger them. While mourning at May's grave, he has a conversation with Hogan and is inspired to carry on; Parker, having dropped out of school, starts studying to get his GED and makes a new suit to resume his super-heroics as Spider-Man, who is now re-considered as a hero, although a now unaware Jameson continues his smear campaign against him.

Alternate versions

What If...? 

An alternate version of Peter Parker appears in the animated series What If...?, in which he is voiced by Hudson Thames.

Zombie outbreak 

In an alternate 2018, Parker (marketed as Zombie Hunter Spider-Man) is among the survivors of a quantum virus outbreak which transforms the infected into zombies, and joins the other survivors in search of a cure at Camp Lehigh. After a fight with a zombified Wanda Maximoff, he escapes with T'Challa and Scott Lang, taking the Mind Stone to Wakanda to put an end to the virus. Unbeknownst to the trio however, a zombified Thanos has invaded Wakanda with his army.

Spider-Man: No Way Home

"Peter-Two" 

Years following the events of Spider-Man 3 (2007), Peter Parker's (portrayed by Tobey Maguire) relationship with Mary Jane "MJ" Watson had become complicated but eventually worked out. Due to Strange's malfunctioned spell, Parker is brought into the MCU and subsequently begins searching for that universe's Parker. After meeting an alternate version of himself and comforting "Peter-One"s loss of his aunt, the Spider-Men work together to cure the supervillains and Parker subsequently reunites with Octavius. Parker stops "Peter-One" from killing Green Goblin out of rage, having previously reminded him that revenge would not suffice May's death, but this leads to him being stabbed in the back and injured by Goblin, who is in turn cured by "Peter-One". Parker says goodbye to his alternate versions and returns to his universe.

"Peter-Three" 

Following the events of The Amazing Spider-Man 2 (2014), Peter Parker's (portrayed by Andrew Garfield) failure to save Gwen Stacy caused him to become bitter and overly aggressive and vengeful towards criminals, devoting most of his time to being Spider-Man. After Strange's malfunctioned spell, Parker is brought into the MCU and subsequently begins searching for that universe's Parker. After meeting an alternate version of himself and comforting "Peter-One"'s loss of his aunt, the Spider-Men work to cure the villains, with "Peter-One" curing Curt Connors and Parker reconciling with Dillon, who had been cured by Otto Octavius. After Green Goblin destroys the contained spell, MJ falls from the scaffolding but is saved by Parker, bringing closure to his failure. Parker and "Peter-One" inject Osborn with a cure "Peter-Two" developed, restoring his sanity. Parker says goodbye to his alternate versions and returns to his universe as a happier man.

Spider-Man: Freshman Year 
Spider-Man: Freshman Year and its second season, subtitled Sophomore Year, will explore an alternate Peter Parker's origin story and early days using the Spider-Man persona as he is mentored by Norman Osborn in his freshman and sophomore years of high school.

Concept and creation

Background and development 
The Marvel Comics character Peter Parker / Spider-Man first appeared in the fifteenth and final issue of Marvel's anthology comic book series Amazing Fantasy, which was published in August 1962. The issue was written by Marvel Comics editor and head writer Stan Lee and drawn and penciled by artist Steve Ditko; Lee wanted to create a character whom teens could identify with, and was influenced by pulp magazine crime fighter the Spider. He also took inspiration from seeing a spider climb up a wall. The character became popular during the 1960s, and was adapted into various forms of media–including five films by Sony Pictures from 2002 to 2014, starring Tobey Maguire in three films directed by Sam Raimi as Spider-Man and Andrew Garfield in two films directed by Marc Webb as the character.

Following the November 2014 hacking of Sony Pictures' computers, emails between Sony Pictures Entertainment co-chairman Amy Pascal and president Doug Belgrad were released stating that Marvel Studios wanted to include Spider-Man (whose film rights are licensed to Sony) in their Marvel Cinematic Universe (MCU) film Captain America: Civil War (2016), but talks between the studios concerning this were believed to have broken down. However, in February 2015, the studios reached a licensing deal for the use of Spider-Man in an MCU film, and reports indicated that the character would indeed appear in Civil War. According to the deal, Sony Pictures would continue to own, finance, distribute, and exercise final creative control over the Spider-Man films. Marvel Studios president Kevin Feige stated in April 2015 that they decided to not retell the character's origins in Civil War since there had been two previous retellings with the Raimi and Webb films, so Marvel Studios was "going to take it for granted that people know that, and the specifics". Feige also stated that Marvel had been working to add Spider-Man to the MCU since at least October 2014. The following June, Feige clarified that the initial Sony deal does not allow the character to appear in any of the MCU television series, as it was "very specific... with a certain amount of back and forth allowed."

By August 2019, Marvel Studios and its parent company The Walt Disney Studios had spent several months discussing expanding their deal with Sony. The existing deal had Marvel and Feige produce the Spider-Man films for Sony and receive 5% of their revenue. Sony wanted to expand the deal to include more films while keeping the same terms of the original agreement. Disney expressed concern with Feige's workload producing the MCU already and asked for a 25–50% stake in any future films Feige produced for Sony. Unable to come to an agreement, Sony announced that it would be moving forward on the next Spider-Man film without Feige or Marvel's involvement. The next month, Sony Pictures Entertainment chairman Tony Vinciquerra confirmed the character would be integrated with Sony's own shared universe–Sony's Spider-Man Universe (SSU)–moving forward. MCU Spider-Man actor Tom Holland personally spoke to Disney CEO Bob Iger and Sony Pictures Motion Picture Group chairman Tom Rothman, partly making the companies return to negotiations. In late September, Sony and Disney announced a new agreement that would allow Marvel Studios and Feige to produce another MCU Spider-Man film–Spider-Man: No Way Home (2021)–with Amy Pascal. Disney was reportedly co-financing 25% of No Way Home in exchange for 25% of the film's profit, while retaining the character's merchandising rights. The agreement also allowed Holland's Spider-Man to appear in a future Marvel Studios film as well as crossing over to the SSU, with the latter interaction described as "a 'call and answer' between the two franchises as they acknowledge details between the two in what would loosely be described as a shared detailed universe."

Casting and appearances 

Sony was reportedly looking for an actor younger than Andrew Garfield to play Spider-Man, with Logan Lerman and Dylan O'Brien considered front-runners. Later in April 2015, Nat Wolff, Asa Butterfield, Tom Holland, Timothée Chalamet, and Liam James were under consideration by Sony and Marvel to play Spider-Man, with Holland and Butterfield as the front-runners. Butterfield, Holland, Judah Lewis, Matt Lintz, Charlie Plummer, and Charlie Rowe screen tested for the lead role against Robert Downey Jr., who portrays Tony Stark / Iron Man in the MCU, for "chemistry". The six were chosen out of a search of over 1,500 actors to test in front of Feige, Pascal, and the Russo brothers—the directors of Captain America: Civil War. Feige and Pascal narrowed the actors considered to Holland and Rowe, with both screen testing with Downey again. Holland also tested with Chris Evans, who portrays Steve Rogers / Captain America in the MCU, and emerged as the favorite. On June 23, Marvel and Sony officially announced that Holland would star as Spider-Man in the MCU in Spider-Man: Homecoming (2017). The Russos "were pretty vocal" about whom they wanted for the role, pushing to cast an actor close to the age of Peter Parker to differentiate from the previous portrayals. They also praised Holland for having a dancing and gymnastics background.

A scene in Iron Man 2 (2010) depicts a young boy in a child's Iron Man mask targeted by Justin Hammer's drones before being rescued by Stark; Max Favreau, the son of director Jon Favreau, plays the boy. In 2017, Watts said that he had suggested to Feige that they retroactively establish this child to be the introduction of a young Parker to the MCU, an idea that Holland supported; however, this notion has yet to be confirmed in any MCU film or television series. The first reference to Spider-Man within the MCU, following the deal with Sony, is at the end of Ant-Man (2015) according to its director Peyton Reed. The reference is made by a reporter to Sam Wilson / Falcon, who is looking for Ant-Man. The reporter states, "Well, we got everything nowadays. We got a guy who jumps, we got a guy who swings, we got a guy who crawls up the walls, you gotta be more specific."

In February 2021, Holland said No Way Home was the final film under his contract but he hoped to continue playing Spider-Man in the future if asked. That October, Holland said No Way Home was being treated as "the end of a franchise" that began with Homecoming, with any additional solo films featuring the MCU Spider-Man characters to be different from the first trilogy of films and feature a tonal change. By November, Holland was unsure if he should continue making Spider-Man films and felt he would have "done something wrong" if he was still portraying the character in his thirties. He expressed interest in a film focusing on the Miles Morales version of Spider-Man instead. Despite this, Pascal hoped to continue working with Holland on future Spider-Man films. Later in November, Pascal said there were plans for another trilogy of Spider-Man films starring Holland, with work on the first of those about to begin, though Sony did not yet have official plans for further MCU Spider-Man films.

Tom Holland portrays Peter Parker in Captain America: Civil War, Spider-Man: Homecoming, Avengers: Infinity War, Avengers: Endgame, Spider-Man: Far From Home, and Spider-Man: No Way Home. A fourth MCU Spider-Man film is in development with Holland expected to reprise his role. Hudson Thames voices the character in the What If..? episode "What If... Zombies?!". The Disney+ animated series Spider-Man: Freshman Year explores an alternate Peter Parker in the MCU multiverse's origin story and early days using the Spider-Man persona as he is mentored by Norman Osborn.

Design 

On the Spider-Man suit seen in Civil War, Joe Russo described it as "a slightly more traditional, Steve Ditko influenced suit," and that Civil War would explore the way the suit operates, particularly the mechanical eyes. This suit is primarily used during Homecoming, and has more technical improvements than the previous suits, including the logo on the chest being a remote drone, an AI system similar to Tony Stark's J.A.R.V.I.S., a holographic interface, a parachute, a tracking device for Stark to track Parker, a heater, an airbag, the ability to light up, and the ability to augment reality with the eyepieces. Stark also builds in a "training wheels" protocol, to initially limit Parker's access to all of its features. Homecoming co-producer Eric Hauserman Carroll noted Marvel Studios went through the comics and "pull[ed] out all the sort of fun and wacky things the suit did" to include in the Homecoming suit. Spider-Man's web-shooters have various settings, first teased at the end of Civil War, which Carroll explained allowed him to "adjust the spray" to different settings like the spinning web, web ball, or ricochet web. He compared this to a DSLR camera. In The Moviemaking Magic of Marvel Studios: Spider-Man (2021), Holland says that "what [he] loves about the original web-shooters is they're as real as they could be," and compares them to Andrew Garfield's Spider-Man, saying that his web-shooters "[never made] much sense to [him]." Spider-Man's Iron Spider armor, used by the character during the Civil War comic storyline, was also considered to appear in the Civil War film.

Spider-Man: Far From Home (2019) reuses two of Spider-Man's costumes from the previous films: his main costume from Captain America: Civil War and Spider-Man: Homecoming, and the Iron Spider suit from Avengers: Infinity War (2018) and Avengers: Endgame. It also introduces two new costumes: a black "stealth" costume given to Parker by Nick Fury, and a new, upgraded Spider-Man suit that Parker designs for himself at the end of the film. Marvel Studios' head of visual development Ryan Meinerding explained that Watts had wanted to include a suit inspired by the Spider-Man Noir version of the character, which led to the design of the more tactical stealth suit. He added that the suit represents Parker experimenting with being a new kind of superhero. Other tactical costumes from the comic books were looked at when developing this one, but Meinerding felt they looked less practical than the more straightforward Noir inspiration. The costume includes tactical goggles that can be flipped up. For Parker's new self-designed costume, Meinerding originally designed it with the idea that it would be made from Parker's webbing since that is the strongest material he has access to. Practical versions of the costumes were created by Ironhead Studio, who previously worked on The Amazing Spider-Man films. For Far From Home, Ironhead developed a skull cap for the costumes that has built-in fans to prevent the goggles from steaming up. They also developed a magnetic bellows system for connecting the goggles to the mask, so they could be easily removed but not fall off during action sequences.

Spider-Man suits featured in Spider-Man: Freshman Year (2024) include his homemade suit made from "gym pants, sneakers, goggles, a blue sweatshirt, red undershirt, knee pads, very clunky webshooters, and a red logo on the chest", a "beetle" costume, a yellow suit, a dark suit, a "classic 60s" red and blue suit, and a white and blue Oscorp suit.

List of MCU Spider-Man suits 

 The  is a suit developed by Peter Parker during his early months as Spider-Man. It appears briefly in Captain America: Civil War and is used for the climax of Spider-Man: Homecoming. Trixter applied a rigging, muscle and cloth system to Sony Pictures Imageworks's homemade suit to "mimic the appearance of the rather loose training suit".
 The  was a suit developed by Tony Stark for Parker, described as an upgrade to the Homemade one. It first appears as Parker's primary suit in Civil War and Homecoming, Parker ceases to use it in Avengers: Infinity War, and the suit is blown up in Spider-Man: Far From Home. A variation of this suit appears in What If...?
 The Iron Spider armor, also known as Item A17, was a suit developed by Stark that was made out of nanotechnology. The Department of Damage Control confiscate the charger in mid-2024, and Otto Octavius absorbs its nanites for his tentacles later that year; he eventually returns it to Parker. The armor appears at the end of Homecoming, is  primarily used for Infinity War and Avengers: Endgame, at the start of Far From Home, and one time in Spider-Man: No Way Home. For the suit's first appearance, Framestore created models and textures in anticipation for future MCU projects, while Trixter created the "clean, high tech" vault that the suit appears in.
 The  is a suit made by Fury for Parker. Parker becomes the vigilante Night-Monkey, a "European rip-off of Spider-Man", to conceal his identity using this suit. A prison warden steals the mask in Netherlands. It appears in Spider-Man: Far From Home.
 The  is a red-and-black Spider-Man suit created by Parker using the Stark Industries Fabricator. It also contains a white spider-emblem on the front and back. A burglar throws paint on the suit, which remains uncleanable until May Parker (Marisa Tomei) cleans it months later. It forms into the Integrated Suit when Octavius returns his stolen nanites he stole from the Iron Spider armor. It appears in Spider-Man: Far From Home and No Way Home.
 The  is the Upgraded Suit inside-out. Parker uses this suit to defeat Electro in No Way Home.
 The  is the Upgraded Suit combined with the Iron Spider armor's nanites. It appears in No Way Home.
 Parker makes a new suit for himself at the end of No Way Home, inspired by the original red-and-blue suit of the early Spider-Man comics. A similar suit appears in Freshman Year.

Characterization 
Parker is recruited by Stark in Civil War to help him arrest Rogers and his rogue Avengers. Feige said that Parker would be torn between superhero ideologies, saying, "Does he want to be like these other characters? Does he want nothing to do with these other characters? How does that impact his experience, being this grounded but super powerful hero? Those are all the things that Stan Lee and Steve Ditko played with in the first 10 years of his comics, and that now we can play with for the first time in a movie." On aligning with Stark, Anthony Russo said that, despite entering the conflict after the two factions have formed and not having much political investment, Parker's choice comes from "a very personal relationship" he develops with Stark. The Russos hoped "to take a very logical and realistic and naturalistic approach to the character" compared to the previous film portrayals. Anthony Russo added that the character's introduction had to fit "that specific tonal stylistic world" of the MCU, as well as the tone established by the directors in Winter Soldier, saying, "It's a little more grounded and a little more hard-core contemporary." That was "coloring our choices a lot" with Parker.

Though the MCU films do not depict Parker's origin story, Parker's Uncle Ben, whose death was a significant event in both the comic books and previous film series, is indirectly referenced in Spider-Man: Homecoming. There was some discussion to include a direct reference to Ben when Peter is getting ready for his homecoming by the revelation that his wardrobe consisted of Ben's clothes, but the writers desisted because they felt that the moment veered away from Parker's character arc and made Ben's death feel like a "throwaway line". The one exception is the animated What If...? episode "What If... Zombies?!", where an alternate version of Parker mentions everyone who has died in his life in the episode's timeline.

Another change is Parker's close paternal relationship with Stark. This was partially adapted from the limited series Civil War, its three-issue prelude on The Amazing Spider-Man by J. Michael Straczynski, and the Ultimate Marvel comics where Stark and Parker share a trainer-trainee relationship. Some critics disliked Parker's reliance on Stark, as opposed to previous cinematic portrayals of Spider-Man showing the character as more self-reliant; several of Parker's proper Spider-Man suits in the MCU are also designed by Stark, or built by Parker with Stark Industries technology, whereas in the comics Parker designed and constructed much of his suits entirely by himself while Stark only made the Iron Spider Suit.

Parker's relationships with Mary Jane "MJ" Watson or Gwen Stacy do not exist in the MCU, instead he falls in love with Michelle "MJ" Jones-Watson (Zendaya) a fellow school student after his previous crush, high school senior Liz, moves away. Although MJ is an original character, Spider-Man: Homecoming co-screenwriter John Francis Daley stated that she was intended as a reinvention of Mary Jane and that the nickname was an homage to her.

Reception 

For their reviews of Spider-Man: Homecoming, Sara Stewart of the New York Post attributed much of the "heavy-lifting" to Holland's performance and the "perfectly cast" Michael Keaton (Vulture). She also noted Watts' focus on Parker's human side, while Mike Ryan at Uproxx felt it was the best Spider-Man film yet, with one of his specific praises being the younger and more optimistic portrayal of Parker. Richard Roeper of the Chicago Sun-Times praised its focus on the character's school life and called Holland "terrific and well-cast", while Owen Gleiberman of Variety highlighted Homecomings focus on making Peter Parker a realistically youthful and grounded character. He found Holland to be likable in the role, but did criticize the vague take on Spider-Man's origin and powers, but "the flying action has a casual flip buoyancy, and the movie does get you rooting for Peter." At IndieWire, David Ehrlich praised the elements of the film that leaned into the high school life of Parker, while Kenneth Turan of the Los Angeles Times criticized the "juvenile" depiction of Parker and Watts' "unevenly orchestrated" direction. Meanwhile, The Hollywood Reporter John DeFore praised Holland's performance as "winning" despite the Homecoming script, and Mick LaSalle, writing for the San Francisco Chronicle, said the film did not explore the human side of Spider-Man enough and instead focused on action that is "not thrilling". Robbie Collin of The Telegraph criticized Watts' direction but was positive of Holland, Keaton, Tomei, and Zendaya.

For their reviews of Spider-Man: Far From Home, Gleiberman again praised Holland's performance, along with Roeper, while Alonso Duralde of TheWrap highlighted the cast, including the chemistry between Holland, Zendaya, and Jacob Batalon (Ned Leeds). Ehrlich criticized the character development of Spider-Man in the film, feeling that he does not change throughout the film beyond becoming more confident. John Anderson of The Wall Street Journal also praised Holland and Zendaya's performances.

Spider-Man: No Way Home features several characters from Sam Raimi's Spider-Man trilogy and Marc Webb's The Amazing Spider-Man duology, including past Spider-Man actors Tobey Maguire and Andrew Garfield as their respective Spider-Men. The multiverse aspect was widely praised by critics and audiences, and generated much speculation before the film's release. In their reviews, Don Kaye, writing for Den of Geek, praised the performances and chemistry of the cast, stating that "No Way Home channels the entire spectrum of Spider-Man movies while setting the character on a course all his own at last", while Pete Hammond of Deadline Hollywood praised Watts's direction and wrote that Holland, Zendaya, and Batalon are "a priceless trio"; Jennifer Bisset of CNET praised the performances, writing: "A Russo Brothers influence can almost be felt ushering Holland's third Spider-Man movie into new, weightier territory. If the character is to become the next Tony Stark, this is the way to etch a few more scars into a more interesting hero's facade"; DeFore felt that the inclusion of "multiversal mayhem" in No Way Home addressed the "Iron Man-ification" of MCU Spider-Man that made Holland-centric films "least fun"; Roeper again praised the performances of Holland and Zendaya, writing that while there is "nothing new or particularly memorable about the serviceable CGI and practical effects," he and the audience remain invested because Holland "remains the best of the cinematic Spider-Men".

Accolades 
Holland has received numerous nominations and awards for his portrayal of Spider-Man.

In other media

Films 
 At one point, the writers of the Sony Pictures Animation film Spider-Man: Into the Spider-Verse (2018) wished to include a post-credits scene with cameos by Maguire, Garfield, and Holland, but this was cut as Sony felt such a moment at the time was too risky and would prove confusing. Holland recalls his cameo was as a passerby at a train station who says, "Hey, kid!" to Miles Morales.
 The MCU's Spider-Man has made an appearance and been referenced in the SSU, a standalone media franchise and shared universe connected to the MCU through the multiverse. The films in the SSU focus on supporting characters featured in Spider-Man comics, with a particular emphasis on his rogues gallery.
 Holland had filmed a cameo appearance as Peter Parker for Venom (2018), prior to Marvel Studios asking Sony to exclude it.
 Holland makes a cameo appearance as Peter Parker in the mid-credits scene of Venom: Let There Be Carnage (2021), where it is revealed that J. Jonah Jameson's broadcast incriminating him as Mysterio's "murderer" was witnessed by a universe-displaced Eddie Brock and his symbiote companion Venom, simultaneous with the events of No Way Home.
 Spider-Man and the events of No Way Home are referenced and depicted in the mid and post-credit scenes of Morbius (2022), by the relevation of Adrian Toomes being transported from the MCU to the Sony's Spider-Man Universe due to Strange's second spell. Assuming Spider-Man was responsible, he constructs a new Vulture suit and approaches Dr. Michael Morbius in forming a team.

Comics 
 An alternate Spider-Man wearing a version of the Homecoming Stark suit appears in the comics crossover event Spider-Geddon (2018), implied to be the MCU version of Spider-Man.
 An alternate Spider-Man wearing a version of the Infinity War Iron Spider suit appears in the third volume of the second Spider-Verse event (2019), alongside a version of the MCU Iron Man.

Video games 
 All of the MCU Spider-Man suits, except the suit introduced at the end of No Way Home, are available in the 2018 video game Spider-Man, initially developed by Insomniac Games for PlayStation 4. The suits created for No Way Home, the Integrated and Black/Gold Suits, are exclusive to the PlayStation 5 and Microsoft Windows version of the game, Spider-Man Remastered (2020). The Homecoming suit is named the "Stark Suit" in-game, while the Integrated Suit is named the "Hybrid Suit".
 Holland's Spider-Man and Zendaya's MJ, based on their appearances in No Way Home, are purchasable outfits in Fortnite.
 The main suits from Homecoming and Far From Home, as well as the MCU's version of the Iron Spider armor, are all featured as downloadable content (DLC) costumes for Spider-Man in Square Enix's Avengers (2020) game on PlayStation 4 and PlayStation 5.

Additionally, Holland reprises his role as Peter Parker / Spider-Man in Web Slingers: A Spider-Man Adventure, an interactive theme park screen ride at Disney California Adventure's Avengers Campus and Walt Disney Studios Park.

See also 
 Characters of the Marvel Cinematic Universe
 Spider-Man in film

Notes

References

External links 
 Peter Parker on the Marvel Cinematic Universe Wiki
 Zombie Outbreak Spider-Man on the Marvel Cinematic Universe Wiki
 
 Peter Parker on Marvel.com

Alternative versions of Spider-Man
Avengers (film series)
Marvel Comics child superheroes
Fictional characters displaced in time
Fictional characters from Queens, New York
Fictional characters with precognition
Fictional characters with superhuman durability or invulnerability
Fictional characters with superhuman senses
Fictional hackers
Fictional high school students
Fictional inventors
Fictional outlaws
Fictional people from the 21st-century
Fictional vigilantes
Film characters introduced in 2016
Male characters in film
Marvel Cinematic Universe characters
Marvel Comics American superheroes
Marvel Comics characters who can move at superhuman speeds
Marvel Comics characters with accelerated healing
Marvel Comics characters with superhuman strength
Marvel Comics male superheroes
Orphan characters in film
Sony's Spider-Man Universe
Spider-Man (2017 film series)
Spider-Man film characters
Spider-Man in other media
Superheroes who are adopted
Superheroes with alter egos
Teenage characters in film
Teenage superheroes